MacLeay or Macleay or McLeay may refer to:

People 
 Alexander Macleay (1767–1848), Scottish civil servant and entomologist.
 George Macleay (1809–1891), Australian explorer and politician.
 George McLeay (1892–1955), Australian politician
 Glenn McLeay (born 1968), New Zealand cyclist
 John McLeay Jr. (1922–2000), Australian politician
 John McLeay Sr. (1893–1982), Australian politician
 Ken MacLeay (born 1959), English-born Australian cricketer.
 Leo McLeay (born 1945), Australian politician.
 Paul McLeay (born 1972), Australian politician
 William John Macleay (1820–1891), Australian politician and naturalist.
 William Sharp Macleay (1792–1865), British entomologist.

Places 
 Electoral district of Macleay, New South Wales, Australia.
 Macleay Island, Moreton Bay, Queensland, Australia.
 Macleay Museum of science, University of Sydney, Australia.
 Macleay River, New South Wales, Australia.
 Macleay Shire, a former LGA in New South Wales, Australia.

Animals 
 Macleay's dorcopsis, Dorcopsulus macleayi, a marsupial.
 Macleay's honeyeater, Xanthotis macleayanus, a bird.
 Macleay's mustached bat, Pteronotus macleayii.
 Macleay's swallowtail, Graphium macleayanus, a butterfly.
 Macleay's spectre, Extatosoma tiaratum, a stick insect.